Erik Martin Broberg (born 24 September 1990) is a Swedish footballer who plays for Örebro SK as a midfielder.

Career statistics

References

External links

1990 births
Living people
Association football midfielders
Djurgårdens IF Fotboll players
Allsvenskan players
Superettan players
Ettan Fotboll players
Eliteserien players
Odds BK players
Swedish footballers
Swedish expatriate footballers
Expatriate footballers in Norway
Swedish expatriate sportspeople in Norway
Norwegian Second Division players
Örebro SK players
People from Karlskoga Municipality
Sportspeople from Örebro County